The 1964–65 Spartan League season was the 47th in the history of Spartan League. The league consisted of 18 teams.

League table

The division featured 18 teams, 16 from last season and 2 new teams:
 Hampton, from Surrey Senior League
 Addlestone, from Surrey Senior League

References

1964–65
9